Callewaert's mouse (Mus callewaerti) is a species of rodent in the family Muridae.
It is found in Angola and Democratic Republic of the Congo.
Its natural habitat is dry savanna.

References

Mus (rodent)
Mammals described in 1925
Taxa named by Oldfield Thomas
Taxonomy articles created by Polbot